Tams may refer to:
The Tams, an American vocal group
Tams, West Virginia, United States, an unincorporated community
Memphis Tams, former name (1972–1974) of the Memphis Sounds American basketball franchise based in Memphis, Tennessee
John Tams (born 1949), English actor, singer, songwriter, composer and musician
Willie Horace Thomas Tams (1891–1980), British lepidopterist and entomologist

TAMS or TamS may refer to:
TamS, a theatre in Munich, Germany
Texas Academy of Mathematics and Science, an early college entrance program
Territory and Municipal Services Directorate (Australian Capital Territory), an agency of the Australian Capital Territory Government
Total Airport Management Systems, an integrated computer system used at Kuala Lumpur International Airport
Takeoff Acceleration Monitoring System, a less comprehensive version of Take-off performance monitoring systems (TOPMS).

See also 
TAM (disambiguation)